Doug E. Doug (born Douglas Bourne; January 7, 1970) is an American actor. He started his career at age 17 as a stand-up comedian. He played the role of Griffin Vesey on the CBS sitcom Cosby, Sanka Coffie in the film Cool Runnings, and the voice of Bernie in the animated film Shark Tale.

Early life

Douglas Bourne was born in Brooklyn, New York to a Jamaican father and African-American mother.

Career
Doug has appeared in a number of films, including Jungle Fever (1991), Hangin' with the Homeboys (1991), Class Act (1992), Cool Runnings (1993), Operation Dumbo Drop (1995), the remake of Disney's That Darn Cat (1997), and Eight Legged Freaks (2002). He was the star of his own short-lived ABC sitcom, Where I Live, a show which won the acclaim of Bill Cosby, and subsequently played Hilton Lucas's boarder and surrogate son Griffin Vesey on Cosby. In 2004, he had a voice role in the animated feature Shark Tale, and also appeared on two episodes of Law & Order: Special Victims Unit (2004, 2012).

Professional career
Doug E. Doug started off his career as a stand-up comic at the age of 17. Doug was first seen at the Apollo Theater by Russell Simmons, who then asked Doug to write and host a syndicated late-night program Simmons produced called The New Music Report. His entrance into film began when he spoke one line in Spike Lee's film Mo' Better Blues.

Doug is known to movie viewers for his starring role as the spirited pushcart driver turned bobsled racer in Cool Runnings. The movie is loosely based on the true story of the first Jamaica national bobsled team trying to make it to the Winter Olympics.

Doug is also known for his roles as the ne'er do well Willie Stevens in Hangin' with the Homeboys. For this role, he received an Independent Spirit Award nomination for Best Actor. He played a class comedian in Class Act, a soldier enlisted for an unusual duty in Operation Dumbo Drop, an ill-fated high school student in the horror epic Dr. Giggles, and an FBI agent in the 1997 remake of That Darn Cat. In the Warner Bros. science fiction comedy Eight Legged Freaks, he portrayed a paranoid small-town radio host with visions of an alien invasion. In the animated DreamWorks film, Shark Tale, his is the voice of Bernie the jellyfish.

In television, Doug starred in the ABC series Where I Live, a show developed around his life and on which he served as co-producer. In the series, he portrayed Douglas Saint Martin, a quirky teenager growing up in a working-class Caribbean family in New York. Doug also co-hosted the VH-1 series Rock of Ages and spent four seasons starring as the character Griffin in the television series Cosby. On the Nickelodeon animated show, Little Bill, Doug voiced Percy the pet store owner. Doug guest-starred in Touched by an Angel, Law and Order: SVU, and NBC's Conviction.

In theater, Doug starred in the musical Purlie. It ran from March 31 through April 3, 2005.

Doug made his debut as a director/producer with the screenplay Citizen James, in which he also co-wrote and starred. Citizen James aired on Starz Encore/ BET Movies.

Doug launched a new YouTube comedy channel The Doug Life Show in late 2012 as part of The Comedy Shaq Network. It is a series of skit comedy and commentaries very loosely based around the experiences, thoughts, and life of Doug.

He stars in the 2015 movie An Act of War.

Filmography

Film

Television

Award nominations

References

External links

1970 births
Living people
Male actors from New York City
African-American male actors
African-American male comedians
African-American film directors
American male comedians
American male film actors
Film producers from New York (state)
American male screenwriters
American male television actors
Television producers from New York City
American male voice actors
American actors of Jamaican descent
People from Brooklyn
20th-century American male actors
Comedians from New York City
Film directors from New York City
Screenwriters from New York (state)
20th-century American comedians
21st-century American comedians
20th-century African-American people
21st-century African-American people